Pamela Ann Spencer-Marquez (born October 8, 1957) is a retired high jumper from the United States, who set her personal best on 1981-08-28, jumping 1.97 metres at a meet in Brussels, Belgium. She competed for her native country at the 1984 Summer Olympics in Los Angeles, California, finishing in eleventh place (1.85 metres).

Spencer grew up in Great Falls, Montana and attended Great Falls High School where she set state records in the high jump. She later attended Seattle Pacific University and California State University, Northridge where she graduated in 1983.

Spencer is a two-time national champion (1981 and 1984), and was a member of the 1976 and of the 1980 Olympic Teams which was unable to compete due to the 1980 Summer Olympics boycott. She did receive one of 461 Congressional Gold Medals created especially for the spurned athletes. In 1981, she raised the American record twice, up to her personal best of 1.97 m.  Spencer was also a member of the 1984 U.S. Olympic Team.

Pam married Eric Marquez in 1982 and they have two children. They currently reside in Northridge, CA.

International competitions

References

External links
 
 Mt Sac Relays Hall of Fame profile
 Profile at trackfield.brinkster.net
 

American track and field coaches
American female high jumpers
Athletes (track and field) at the 1976 Summer Olympics
Athletes (track and field) at the 1984 Summer Olympics
Athletes (track and field) at the 1975 Pan American Games
Athletes (track and field) at the 1979 Pan American Games
Olympic track and field athletes of the United States
1957 births
Living people
Place of birth missing (living people)
Track and field athletes from California
Pan American Games silver medalists for the United States
Pan American Games medalists in athletics (track and field)
Congressional Gold Medal recipients
Medalists at the 1979 Pan American Games
21st-century American women
Competitors at the 1975 Summer Universiade
Competitors at the 1979 Summer Universiade